Charles Alfred Voegeli (November 23, 1904 - March 2, 1984) was bishop of the Episcopal Diocese of Haiti, serving from 1943 to 1971.

Early life and education
Voegeli was born on November 23, 1904, in Hawthorne, New Jersey. He  graduated from Morristown High School in 1922 and later enrolled in a degree in law at the New Jersey Law School in 1925. In 1930 he received a Bachelor of Arts degree from Upsala College. Later he studied theology at the General Theological Seminary and graduated in 1933. He was ordained deacon of May 1933 and priest in December of the same year in St Peter's Church in Morristown, New Jersey.

Priest
After ordination he served as rector of St Andrew's Church in Harrington Park, New Jersey. In 1937 he was also appointed rector of Trinity Church in Woodbridge, New Jersey. In 1938 he was appointed as dean of the Cathedral of St Luke in Ancón, Canal Zone and chaplain of the Bella Vista Children's Home.

Bishop
In October 1943, Voegeli was elected Bishop of Haiti. Voegeli was consecrated bishop of Haiti by the Presiding Bishop Henry St. George Tucker in St. Peter's Church Morristown, New Jersey, on December 16, 1943. His time as bishop in Haiti was characterized with the growth and expansion of the church in Haiti, especially after gaining government approval in 1947. In 1964 he was forced at gunpoint by armed immigration officers to leave Haiti. He was escorted to the airport and sent on the first flight to Puerto Rico. He continued to administer the diocese from Puerto Rico and later New York. He remained bishop of Haiti until his retirement in 1971. He died on March 2, 1984, due to a heart attack.

References 

1904 births
1984 deaths
General Theological Seminary alumni
Morristown High School (Morristown, New Jersey) alumni
People from Hawthorne, New Jersey
20th-century American Episcopalians
American expatriate bishops
American expatriates in Haiti
Episcopal bishops of Haiti
20th-century American clergy